Peter Sheppard may refer to:
Peter Clapham Sheppard, painter
P.A. Sheppard (Percival Albert Sheppard, 1907–1977), known as Peter, British meteorologist
Pete Sheppard (born 1967), radio host
Peter Sheppard (motorcycle racer), rode in 1966 and 1968 Grand Prix motorcycle racing season

See also
Peter Shepherd (disambiguation)